Movses is an Armenian given name, equivalent to Moses.

It gave rise to the surname Movsesian.

The name may refer to:

Places
 Movses, a village in Tavush, Armenia

Catholicoi of the Armenian Apostolic Church
 Moses I (456–461) 
 Moses II of Armenia (574–604) 
 Moses III of Armenia (1629–1632) - Catholicos Movses III of Tatev

Given name
 Movses Khorenatsi (410–490s), Armenian historian and author of History of Armenia
 Movses Kaghankatvatsi, 7th century historian of Caucasian Albania
 Movses Baghramian, 18th century Armenian liberation movement leader 
 Movses Hakobyan, Armenian military leader and the commander in Karabakh
 Movses Silikyan (1862–1937), Armenian general
 Movses Gorgisyan, modern Armenian magazine editor